Washington County State Recreation Area is an Illinois state park on  in Washington County, Illinois, United States.

References

State parks of Illinois
Protected areas of Washington County, Illinois
Protected areas established in 1959
1959 establishments in Illinois